is a Japanese table tennis player.

She was the winner of the 2016 Finlandia Open. She has also won several medals from both the 2017 Summer Universiade and the 2019 Summer Universiade.

References

1997 births
Japanese female table tennis players
Living people
Sportspeople from Aichi Prefecture
Universiade medalists in table tennis
Universiade silver medalists for Japan
Table tennis players at the 2018 Asian Games
Senshu University alumni
Medalists at the 2017 Summer Universiade
Medalists at the 2019 Summer Universiade
Asian Games competitors for Japan
21st-century Japanese women